John Trevor Blokdyk (30 November 1935 in Krugersdorp, Transvaal – 19 March 1995 in Hekpoort, near Krugersdorp) was a South African motorcycle speedway rider and Formula One driver who participated in two World Championship Grands Prix, although qualifying for only one.

Blokdyk rode in speedway in Britain in the late 1950s and early 1960s for Poole Pirates and Ipswich Witches. In 1962 he signed for Leicester Hunters but after one match for the team announced that he was quitting speedway to concentrate on motor racing.

Blokdyk competed in Formula One for the first time in the non-Championship Rand Grand Prix at Kyalami in 1961, in a Cooper, but spun out early on. He was more successful at his next race, the Natal Grand Prix at Westmead, where he finished eighth.

In late 1962, Blokdyk went to Europe to pursue a career in Formula Junior and was soon a front-runner, until he ran short of finances and returned to South Africa. In 1963 he started his only World Championship race at East London, driving a three-year-old Cooper-Maserati prepared by Scuderia Lupini, and coming in 12th. He also finished third in the Mozambique Grand Prix in 1963 and 1964.

He continued in the South African Formula One Championship in 1964 and then moved back to Europe and drove in Formula 3, scoring some good results, including a win at Magny-Cours and Nogaro. He returned to South Africa for the 1964 Rand Grand Prix, where he retired his Cooper-Alfa Romeo with engine problems, and he failed to qualify for the 1965 South African Grand Prix.

Later in 1965 he continued in European Formula 3, and suffered serious pelvic and leg injuries in a crash at Albi which ended his season. On his return in 1966, he finished sixth at Rouen-Les-Essarts, and continued to race in Europe in F3 until 1969, before returning permanently to compete in South Africa. On his retirement he became a farmer, but died following a heart attack aged 59.

Complete Formula One World Championship results
(key)

Complete Formula One non-championship results 
(key) (Races in bold indicate pole position) (Races in italics indicate fastest lap)

References

1935 births
1995 deaths
People from Krugersdorp
South African speedway riders
South African racing drivers
South African Formula One drivers
Poole Pirates riders
Ipswich Witches riders
Leicester Hunters riders
Sportspeople from Gauteng